Stadionul Comunal is a multi-use stadium in Tunari, Romania, it is used mostly for football matches and is the home ground of CS Tunari. The stadium was built in the 1990s, has a capacity of 1,000 seats and was renovated for two times, in 2004, then between 2017 and 2018.

Gallery

References

External links
Stadionul Comunal at soccerway.com

Football venues in Romania
Buildings and structures in Ilfov County